"The Last Fight" is a song by Welsh heavy metal band Bullet for My Valentine, released as the second and lead UK single from their third album, Fever, on 19 April 2010 to the radio and a limited 7" edition of 1000 copies on 17 April 2010 with "Begging for Mercy" as a B-side. An acoustic version of the song was released as a "Pre-order Only" bonus track on the iTunes version of the album. Before all that, "Begging for Mercy" was offered for free download on 14 February 2010 from the band's official website for a limited time.

Reception
"The Last Fight" is one of the most successful songs of Fever, according to most of the critics. Rock Sound establishes that "[...] it demonstrate as much from the outset, presenting fast-paced passages before parrying the momentum into upswings of melody". Along with "Pleasure and Pain" and "Dignity", PopMatters states that these are "[...] high-energy, dynamic songs with powerful vocals and creative solos"; and, along with "Your Betrayal" and the title-track, "Fever", create a "brilliant opening trio", according to BBC.

Charts

Music video 
The music video was released for the UK on 12 March 2010 on the band's MySpace website and on 18 March 2010 worldwide. It consists of a fight between two men in a poorly lit room while the band are playing the song, apparently in the same place. After a long fight, the masked fighter's mask is removed, and it is shown that the man was fighting himself.

Track listing
Digital UK single - Promo single
 "The Last Fight" – 4:18
7" limited edition single - Digital single (other countries)
 "The Last Fight" - 4:18
 "Begging for Mercy" - 3:55

Personnel
Bullet for My Valentine
Matthew "Matt" Tuck - lead vocals, rhythm guitar
Jason "Jay" James - bass guitar, backing vocals
Michael "Padge" Paget - lead guitar, backing vocals
Michael "Moose" Thomas - drums

Additional musicians
Matt Bond - piano on "The Last Fight (Acoustic Version)"

Production
Produced by Don Gilmore
Mixed by Chris Lord-Alge
Music video directed by Paul R. Brown

References

External links
Official Bullet for My Valentine website

Lyrics of "The Last Fight" 
Jive Records

2010 singles
Bullet for My Valentine songs
Songs written by Matthew Tuck
Songs written by Michael Paget
Songs written by Jason James (musician)
2009 songs
Jive Records singles
Songs written by Don Gilmore (record producer)